Alfred Leslie Nichols (2 August 1891 – 14 August 1965) was a former Australian rules footballer who played with Melbourne in the Victorian Football League (VFL).

Notes

External links 

 

1891 births
1965 deaths
Australian rules footballers from Victoria (Australia)
Melbourne Football Club players